The 116th United States Congress, which began on January 3, 2019 and ended on January 3, 2021, enacted 344 public laws and zero private laws.

Public laws
The 116th Congress enacted the following laws:

Private laws
None enacted

Treaties ratified
The following treaties have been ratified in the 116th Congress:

See also
 List of bills in the 116th United States Congress
 List of United States presidential vetoes#Donald Trump
 List of United States federal legislation
 List of acts of the 115th United States Congress
 Lists of acts of the United States Congress
 2010s in United States political history

References

External links

 Authenticated Public and Private Laws from the Federal Digital System
 Legislation & Records Home: Treaties from the Senate
 Public Laws for the 116th Congress at Congress.gov
 Private Laws for the 116th Congress at Congress.gov

116
 
2019-related lists